Jaume Munar was the defending champion but chose not to defend his title.

Ugo Humbert won the title after defeating Adrián Menéndez Maceiras 6–3, 6–4 in the final.

Seeds

Draw

Finals

Top half

Bottom half

References
Main Draw
Qualifying Draw

Open Castilla y León - Men's Singles
2018 Men's Singles
2018 Open Castilla y León